Smith Center may refer to:

Smith Center, Kansas, a city in the United States
Smith Center for the Performing Arts, in Las Vegas, Nevada, U.S.
Smith Campus Center, a building at Harvard University in Cambridge, Massachusetts, U.S.
Charles E. Smith Center, an arena at George Washington University in Washington D.C., U.S.
Clarice Smith Performing Arts Center, at the University of Maryland, College Park, Maryland, U.S.
Dean Smith Center, an arena at the University of North Carolina, Chapel Hill, North Carolina, U.S.